Hans Rehm may refer to:

 (1927–2017), German microbiologist
 (born 1942), German mathematician and chess composer